Dr. D. Y. Patil Medical College, Hospital & Research Centre is a medical college facility located in Pune, India. It is named after D. Y. Patil or Dnyandeo Yashwantrao Patil. It has 250 undergraduate seats for MBBS course.

References

External links
 

Medical colleges in Maharashtra
Education in Pune district
Affiliates of Maharashtra University of Health Sciences
Hospitals in Maharashtra
Educational institutions established in 1996
1996 establishments in Maharashtra